Domenico Massimo (1630 – September 1685) was a Roman Catholic prelate who served as Bishop of Corneto (Tarquinia) e Montefiascone (1671–1685).

He was born in Rome, Italy in 1630 and was ordained as a priest on 5 March 1667.
On 18 March 1671, he was appointed during the papacy of Pope Clement X as Bishop of Corneto (Tarquinia) e Montefiascone. On 30 March 1671, he was consecrated bishop by Camillo Massimi, Cardinal-Priest of Santa Maria in Domnica, with Alessandro Crescenzi (cardinal), Titular Patriarch of Alexandria, and Egidio Colonna (patriarch), Titular Patriarch of Jerusalem, serving as co-consecrators. He served as Bishop of Corneto (Tarquinia) e Montefiascone until his death in September 1685.

References

External links and additional sources
 (for Chronology of Bishops) 
 (for Chronology of Bishops) 

17th-century Italian Roman Catholic bishops
Bishops appointed by Pope Clement X
1630 births
1685 deaths